The Gunnar Holst Medal is awarded annually to distinguished scholars of numismatics. It is awarded by the Gunnar Holst Numismatic Foundation of Göteborg, Sweden. It is named after Gunnar Holst, a numismatist who specialised in Islamic coins.

Recipients of the Gunnar Holst medal 
 1991 Gert Rispling, Stockholm
 1992 Patrick Bruun, Helsingfors
 1993 Philip Grierson, Cambridge
 1994 Martin Price, Athens
 1995 Kolbjørn Skaare, Oslo
 1996 Christian J. Simensen, Oslo
 1997 Ulla Westermark, Stockholm
 1998 Kenneth Jonsson, Stockholm
 1999 Bertel Tingström, Uppsala
 2000 Lars O. Lagerqvist, Stockholm
 2001 Rune Ekre, Svenshögen, and Ioannis Touratsoglou, Athens
 2002 Brita Malmer, Lidingö
 2003 Peter Robert Franke, Munich
 2004 Henrik Klackenberg, Stockholm
 2005 Peter Spufford, Cambridge
 2006 Ian Wiséhn, Stockholm
 2007 Vera Hatz and Gert Hatz, Eutin
 2008 Lucia Travaini, Rome
 2009 Michael Metcalf, Oxford
 2010 Gert Rispling, Norrtälje
 2011 Mark Blackburn (numismatist), Cambridge
 2012 Carmen Arnold-Biucchi, Cambridge, USA
 2013 David Hendin, New York, and Rolf Sandström, Lindome
 2014 Cécile Morrisson, Paris
 2015 Ernst Nordin, Stockholm
 2016 Bengt Holmén, Göteborg
 2017 Michel Amandry, Paris
 2018 Tuukka Talvio, Helsingfors

References

Lists of award winners
Medals
Numismatics
Numismatic associations
Awards for numismatics